Bishop Tesfasellassie Medhin is the serving Bishop of Ethiopian Catholic Eparchy of Adigrat in Ethiopia.

Early life 
He was born on 8 Jan 1953 in Alitena, Ethiopia.

Religious life 
He was Ordained a Priest on 4 Apr 1980. He was Appointed Bishop of Adigrat (Ethiopian), Ethiopia on 16 Nov 2001 and Ordained on 20 Jan 2002.

In November 2021, Tesfaselassie Medhin denounced "a genocidal war" and criticized the joint report of the Ethiopian Human Rights Commission (EHRC) and the United Nations High Commissioner for Human Rights on the situation in the Tigray region.

References

External links

Living people
1953 births
Ethiopian Catholic bishops